The Alberta University of the Arts (AUArts) is a public art university located in Calgary, Alberta, Canada. The university is a co-educational institution that operates four academic schools.  

The institution originated from the art department established by the Southern Alberta Institute of Technology (SAIT) in 1926, later renamed the Alberta College of Art in 1960. It was separated from SAIT in 1985, becoming an independent, publicly funded college. In 1995, the university was granted the authority to issue Bachelor of Fine Arts degrees and was renamed the Alberta College of Art and Design (ACAD). The institution was designated a university by the government of Alberta in 2018 and was renamed the Alberta University of the Arts in the following year, to reflect its change in status.

History
The university's origins date back to the founding of the Provincial Institute of Technology and Art (PITA) in 1916. Beginning with evening and Saturday classes, day classes were offered starting in 1926, with Lars Haukaness appointed as the first head of the art department. In 1960, PITA was renamed the  Southern Alberta Institute of Technology (SAIT), and the art department became the Alberta College of Art (ACA).

In 1973, after eight years of planning and construction, the Alberta College of Art moved into a brand new purpose-built building designed by architectural firm Cohos, Delesalle and Evamy, on the edge of Calgary's North Hill, next to the Southern Alberta Jubilee Auditorium.

The Alberta College of Art became a separate institution from SAIT in 1985, and in 1995 amended its name to become the Alberta College of Art and Design.

On February 1, 2019, ACAD officially became the Alberta University of the Arts.

Academics
As a college, the institution had the authority to grant certificates and diplomas. In 1995 the Alberta Government authorized granting the degree of Bachelor of Fine Arts and in 2000 gave authority to grant the Bachelor of Design degree. The Master of Fine Arts in Craft Media was launched in 2015 with the inaugural class receiving their degrees in May 2017.

In March 2018, ACAD was named a university by the Minister of Advanced Education. It is the only institution in the province to offer and confer university-level undergraduate and now, graduate degree programs in art, craft, and design. On January 17, 2019, the Government of Alberta announced that ACAD was to become the Alberta University of the Arts (abbreviated as AUArts). The transition began on the same day while the name and university status became effective formally on February 1, 2019.

AUArts' degree programs are housed within four administrative schools:
 The School of Craft + Emerging Media (ceramics, fibre, glass, jewellery + metals, and media arts)
 The School of Visual Arts (drawing, painting, print media, photography, and sculpture)
 The School of Communication Design
 The School of Critical + Creative Studies (non-studio academic courses)

Library and galleries
AUArts' Luke Lindoe Library is named after alumnus, instructor, and founder of the Ceramics Department Luke Lindoe, and maintains a collection of over 25,000 art and design-related titles. The university is also home to two professional galleries, the Illingworth Kerr Gallery (IKG) and the Marion Nicoll Gallery (MNG), and nine student-run gallery and pop-up spaces.

The Alberta University of the Arts gallery was renamed after artist and instructor Illingworth Kerr when AUArts moved into its new home (current location) in 1973, expanding into a 9,500 square-foot facility.

The MNG, named after artist and teacher Marion Nicoll, is based on a not-for-profit model and run by the AUArts Students' Association. MNG manages three locations (in AUArts' Main Mall, the AUArts/Jubilee LRT station hallway, and in downtown Calgary's Arts Commons +15 walkway), and focuses on exhibiting student work. AUArtSA also manages nine student exhibition spaces on campus.

Lodgepole Centre
Given its name by AUArts' Elder Council to reflect the supportive nature of the lodgepole, traditionally placed at the centre of the tipi to carry the weight of the covering, AUArts' indigenous resource centre, the Lodgepole Center, officially opened on campus in September 2016. An all-inclusive space, the Lodgepole Center facilitates Elder advising and support, traditional ceremonies, and workshops, and is a quiet study, smudge, and gathering space.

Notable alumni

Notable professors

Current
 Alana Bartol
 Mireille Perron
 Rita McKeough
 Shelley Ouellet

Emeritus

 Henry Glyde, Lecturer Emeritus, 1987
 Illingworth Kerr, Lecturer Emeritus, 1987
 Dr. Stanford Perrott, Lecturer Emeritus, 1987
 Walt Drohan, Lecturer Emeritus, 1991
 George Mihalcheon, Lecturer Emeritus, 1991
 Keith Thomson, Lecturer Emeritus, 1991
 George Wood, Lecturer Emeritus, 1991
 Royston Evans, Lecturer Emeritus, 1995
 Dr. Verna Reid, Lecturer Emeritus, 1995
 Kenneth Samuelson, Lecturer Emeritus, 1997
 Gilbert Flodberg, Lecturer Emeritus, 1998
 Albert Borch, Lecturer Emeritus, 1999
 Katie Ohe, Lecturer Emeritus, 2001
 Richard Halliday, Lecturer Emeritus, 2003
 Pauline Butling, Lecturer Emeritus, 2004
 Alexandra Haeseker, Lecturer Emeritus, 2004
 Ronald Ponech, Lecturer Emeritus, 2006
 Norman Faulkner, Lecturer Emeritus, 2008
 Bill Macdonnell, Lecturer Emeritus, 2008
 Katharine Dickerson, Lecturer Emeritus, 2010
 Wendy Toogood, Lecturer Emeritus, 2010
 Elaine Prodor, Lecturer Emeritus, 2011
 Dan Gordon, Lecturer Emeritus, 2013
 Jane Kidd, Lecturer Emeritus, 2013
 Walter May, Lecturer Emeritus, 2013
 Judith Anne Sterner, Lecturer Emeritus, 2013
 Dennis Budgen, Professor Emeritus, 2014
 Jim Ulrich, Professor Emeritus, 2014
 Sarabeth Carnat, Professor Emeritus, 2014
 Veran Gartley, Professor Emeritus, 2014
 Alan Dunning, Professor Emeritus, 2014
 Eugene Ouchi, Professor Emeritus, 2014
 Larry Riedl, Professor Emeritus, 2014
 Rik Zak, Professor Emeritus, 2014
 Gary Olson, Professor Emeritus, 2015
 Greg Payce, Professor Emeritus, 2015
 Ken Webb, Professor Emeritus, 2015
 Tim Zuck, Professor Emeritus, 2015
 Blake Senini, Professor Emeritus, 2016
 Gord Ferguson, Professor Emeritus, 2017
 David Casey, Professor Emeritus, 2017
 Katrina Chaytor, Professor Emeritus, 2017
 Donald Kottmann, Professor Emeritus, 2018
 Mireille Perron, Professor Emeritus, 2018
 Dr. John Calvelli, Professor Emeritus, 2019
 Dr. Jennifer Salahub, Professor Emeritus, 2019
 Charles Lewton-Brain, Professor Emeritus, 2019
 Jeff Lennard, Professor Emeritus, 2020
 Bill Morton, Professor Emeritus, 2020
 Laura Vickerson, Professor Emeritus, 2020

See also

 Education in Alberta
 List of universities and colleges in Alberta

Notes

References

External links

 
 Alberta University of the Arts Student Association

Universities and colleges in Calgary
Art schools in Canada
Graphic design schools
Design schools
Educational institutions established in 1973
1973 establishments in Alberta
Universities in Alberta